Village Development Committees (VDCs) are voluntary associations of village people for local administration. They are extra constitutional authorities.

VDCs consist of two members each from each caste in the village. The unity of villages can be accredited to this VDCs. The decision of VDCs are ultimate in the concerned villages and persons who disobey the judgement of VDC are boycotted from the villages.

The villagers solve local problems through the help of VDCs and they never need the help of Police and Courts. It is a great form of association by the villagers and it aims to achieve a strong socially fabricated society.

An example of a VDC is Ankapur Village Development Committee. Armoor Mandal has progressed greatly with the help of this VDC.

See also
 Village development committee (Nepal)
 Land-use planning

External links
Articles.timesofindia.indiatimes.com
Lite.epaper.timesofoindia.com

Local government in India